Baptist University of America was a private Baptist Christian university located in Decatur, Georgia near Atlanta. 
It was made up of  a merger of five separate seminaries. It was closed in May 1987.

History
In 1965, Pastor Al Janney began offering college classes. In 1971, he incorporated Baptist University of America, which the classes became part of. Temple Heights Christian College (founded in 1973 by the pastor of Temple Heights Baptist Church), Tallahassee Christian College (founded in 1974 by the pastor of Temple Baptist Church), Regency Baptist College (founded in 1974 by the pastor of Regency Baptist Church), and University Baptist College (founded in 1974 by the pastor of University Baptist Church) merged with Baptist University of America in 1974 and retained the Baptist University of America name. The pastors of Forrest Hills Baptist Church in Decatur, Georgia and Bible Baptist Church in Savannah, Georgia also supported the new organization.  Tampa was used as the campus in the spring of 1974, but it was moved to an Atlanta campus in December of that year.

Closure
Baptist University of America was closed in May 1987.

Notable presidents
Pastor Al Janney (also founded Dade Christian School and New Testament Baptist Church in South Florida) - 1965-1974
Curtis Hutson - 1974-1978
Cecil “the Diesel” Hodges - 1978-1983
”Panama” Jack Baskin 1983-1987

Notable alumni
Daniel Lawrence Whitney (better known by his stage name, Larry the Cable Guy) attended for three years, dropping out after his junior year to pursue a career in stand-up comedy.

References

Defunct private universities and colleges in Georgia (U.S. state)
Educational institutions established in 1965
Educational institutions disestablished in 1987
1965 establishments in Georgia (U.S. state)